Duncan is an unincorporated community in Jackson County, West Virginia, United States. Duncan had a post office, which opened on February 10, 1892, and closed on July 1, 1989.

References

Unincorporated communities in Jackson County, West Virginia
Unincorporated communities in West Virginia